During the 2008–09 English football season, Preston North End F.C. competed in the Championship.

Season summary
Having spent most of the previous season embroiled in a relegation battle, this season Preston edged into the play-offs in sixth place, pipping Cardiff City on the last day of the season. Though being level with seventh-placed Cardiff with 74 points and a goal difference of +12 each, Preston gained sixth place by virtue of having scored one more goal than Cardiff over the course of the season. The run of form that had seen Preston reach the playoffs saw manager Alan Irvine named the Championship's Manager of the Month for April.

Preston were drawn against third-placed Sheffield United in the semi-finals. United won 2–1 over legs, consigning Preston to another season in the second tier of English football.

Kit
For the fourth consecutive season, Preston's kits were manufactured by Italian company Diadora, who introduced new home and away kits. The home kit was a white shirt with navy shorts and navy and white hooped socks, inspired by the club's kit from the late fifties and early sixties. (White shorts were worn for the away match at Wolverhampton Wanderers on 10 January). The away kit was a yellow shirt with navy sleeves, yellow shorts and yellow socks with navy turnovers.

Lancastrian support services company Enterprise remained Preston's kit sponsors.

Results

Legend

Football League Championship

Football League Playoffs

FA Cup

League Cup

Players

First-team squad

Left club during season

References

Notes

Preston North End F.C. seasons
Preston North End